The Princeton Branch is a commuter rail line and service owned and operated by New Jersey Transit (NJT) in the U.S. state of New Jersey. The line is a short branch of the Northeast Corridor Line, running from Princeton Junction northwest to Princeton with no intermediate stops (the line had an intermediate stop, Penns Neck, until 1971). Also known as the Dinky, or the Princeton Junction and Back (PJ&B), the branch is served by special shuttle trains. Now running  along a single track, it is the shortest scheduled commuter rail line in the United States. The run takes approximately 5 minutes in each direction. 

A new station opened on November 17, 2014.

Service on the Princeton Branch was temporarily suspended and replaced by shuttle buses from October 14, 2018 through May 11, 2019, as part of NJT's systemwide service reductions during the installation and testing of positive train control.

Service
The Princeton Branch provides rail service directly to the Princeton University campus from Princeton Junction, where New Jersey Transit and Amtrak provide Northeast Corridor rail service, heading northeast to Newark, New York City, and Boston, and southwest to Trenton, Philadelphia, and Washington. As of 2016, the branch schedule includes 41 round trips each weekday. The line is served by a two-car set of GE Arrow III self-propelled electric coach cars.

Service suspension
In September 2018, New Jersey Transit announced that it would be suspending all service on the Princeton Branch from mid-October 2018 until mid-January 2019, and providing shuttle bus service instead. Restoration of train service was later postponed until May 12, 2019. Systemwide service reductions were attributed to the installation and testing of positive train control, compounded by a shortage of train engineers. The automatic braking system will not be installed on the Princeton Branch itself.

History

Operational milestones

When the Camden and Amboy Rail Road and Transportation Company (C&A) opened its original Trenton–New Brunswick line in 1839, completing the first rail connection between Philadelphia and New York Harbor, the line was located along the east bank of the newly completed Delaware and Raritan Canal, about one mile (2 km) from downtown Princeton. A new alignment (now the Northeast Corridor Line) opened on November 23, 1863, but some passenger trains continued to use the old line until the Princeton Branch opened on May 29, 1865, at the end of the American Civil War. The branch's first train used a Grice & Long wood-burning steam dummy for passenger service, and took about 20 minutes each way. The Pennsylvania Railroad leased and began to operate the C&A, including the Princeton Branch, in 1871. The branch was re-aligned and double-tracked in 1905 to handle popular college football weekends, upgraded from coal to a gasoline-electric train in 1933, fully electrified in 1936, and single-tracked again in 1956. The 1956 rail bridge over U.S. Route 1 was replaced in 1994 to allow further widening of the highway.

Penn Central Transportation took over operations in 1968, and discontinued the little-used Penns Neck station in 1971. When Conrail was formed in 1976, the Final System Plan called for the transfer of the Princeton Branch to Conrail and then to the New Jersey Department of Transportation, but the transfer to NJDOT was not made until 1984.

University highlights
The Princeton train, locally called the "Dinky" or the "PJ&B" (for "Princeton Junction and Back"), is a unique symbol of Princeton University that has grown over time to emblemize the University.  It is mentioned in F. Scott Fitzgerald's "This Side of Paradise", featured in the TV program "Family Ties" when young Alex Keaton goes for his on-campus interview, and it is also in the 1934 Bing Crosby movie "She Loves Me Not".  The theme of Princeton and the train is repeated in the University's own traditional homecoming song "Going Back to Nassau Hall" by Kenneth S. Clark (Class of 1905).  In it, the lyric "We'll clear the track as we go back" refers to the Princeton Branch track leading to the campus.

The Great Dinky Robbery was an incident on May 3, 1963, in which four men boarded the Dinky and abducted four passengers. Princeton was not yet co-educational, and the Dinky was the usual mode of transportation for women dating members of the then all-male student body. On a Friday evening, four Princeton University students, riding horses in Western attire, ambushed the train as it was arriving at Princeton station. A convertible was parked across the track, forcing the Dinky to come to an abrupt halt. The men, including George R. Bunn Jr. of the Bunn coffee maker family, who was armed with a pistol loaded with blanks, boarded the train and persuaded four female passengers to leave with them. The Dinky later resumed its trip and arrived at Princeton station. Although the University administrators were aware of the event and may have known who was involved, they took no official action.

Princeton station relocation and controversy

In 2006, Princeton University announced its intention to construct a new arts center, calling for the replacement of the 1918 Princeton station house, the shortening of the trackage right-of-way, and the creation of a new terminus  to the south. Rail advocates opposed the relocation, fearing that access to the new station would be less convenient, resulting in decreased ridership that could "threaten the train's existence." The proposal prompted protest from residents, students, faculty and alumni, and led to the creation of the organization Save the Dinky and a lengthy series of legal challenges. In October 2010, the Princeton Regional Planning Board passed a resolution supporting the continuation of train service. The new Princeton station opened on November 17, 2014, with construction continuing on a complex of arts and dining buildings in the surrounding area. As of 2017, weekday ridership was down 20 percent from 2012, the last full year of the old station.

Proposed Transitway
The Delaware Valley Regional Planning Commission and New Jersey Transit have conducted studies to develop the Central New Jersey Route 1 Bus Rapid Transit Project. Parts of the proposals call for the construction of a "Dinky Transitway" along the Princeton Branch right-of-way, which would incorporate the rail service and add exclusive bus lanes and a greenway for bicycle and pedestrian traffic.

In April 2012, the university submitted a revised plan for the arts and transit center, calling for the extension of the station's freight house onto the right-of-way for possible use as a restaurant. The Regional Planning Board introduced an ordinance requiring the land be preserved for a transportation right-of-way that could eventually extend farther into Princeton's central business district at Nassau Street. According to the university, ownership of the trackage would have to change hands in order for the transitway to be implemented. Approvals were subsequently issued for converting the station house and the extended freight house into a pair of restaurants.

Stations

References

External links

History of Dinky with photos and map (in German)

 
NJ Transit Rail Operations
Pennsylvania Railroad lines
Princeton University
Railway lines opened in 1865
Transportation in Mercer County, New Jersey
1865 establishments in New Jersey